The Teapot Dome scandal was a bribery scandal involving the administration of United States President Warren G. Harding from 1921 to 1923. Secretary of the Interior Albert Bacon Fall had leased Navy petroleum reserves at Teapot Dome in Wyoming, as well as two locations in California, to private oil companies at low rates without competitive bidding. The leases were the subject of a seminal investigation by Senator Thomas J. Walsh. Convicted of accepting bribes from the oil companies, Fall became the first presidential cabinet member to go to prison; no one was convicted of paying the bribes.

Before the Watergate scandal, Teapot Dome was regarded as the "greatest and most sensational scandal in the history of American politics". It irrevocably damaged the reputation of the Harding administration, which was already severely diminished by its controversial handling of the Great Railroad Strike of 1922 and Harding's 1922 veto of the Bonus Bill. Congress subsequently passed legislation, enduring to this day, giving subpoena power to the House and Senate for review of tax records of any U.S. citizen regardless of elected or appointed position. These resulting laws are also considered to have empowered the role of Congress more generally.

History

In the early 20th century, the U.S. Navy largely obtained fuel oil by converting it from coal. To ensure that the Navy would always have enough fuel available,  President Taft designated several oil-producing areas as naval oil-reserves. In 1921, President Harding issued an executive order that transferred control of  Teapot Dome Oil Field in Natrona County, Wyoming, and the Elk Hills and Buena Vista Oil Fields in Kern County, California, from the  Navy Department to the  Department of the Interior. This was not implemented until the next year, in 1922, when Interior Secretary Fall persuaded  Navy Secretary Edwin C. Denby to transfer control.

Later in 1922, Fall leased the oil-production rights at Teapot Dome to Harry F. Sinclair of Mammoth Oil, a subsidiary of Sinclair Oil Corporation. He also leased the Elk Hills reserve to Edward L. Doheny of Pan American Petroleum and Transport Company. Both leases were issued without competitive bidding, which was legal under the Mineral Leasing Act of 1920.

The lease terms were very favorable to the oil companies, which secretly made Fall a rich man. Fall received a no-interest loan from Doheny of $100,000
in November 1921 (equivalent to $ million in ). He received other gifts from Doheny and Sinclair totaling about $404,000 (equivalent to $ million in ). This money changing hands was illegal, not the leases. Fall attempted to keep his actions secret, but the sudden improvement in his standard of living caused suspicions. He even paid up his ranch taxes, for example, which had been as much as 10 years past due. Carl Magee, who later founded The Albuquerque Tribune, wrote about this sudden affluence and also brought it to the attention of the Senate investigation.

Investigation and outcome

In April 1922, a Wyoming oil operator wrote to his senator, John B. Kendrick, angered that Sinclair had been given a contract to the lands in a secret deal. Kendrick did not respond, but two days later on April 15, he introduced a resolution calling for an investigation of the deal. Republican Senator Robert M. La Follette of Wisconsin led an investigation by the Senate Committee on Public Lands. At first, La Follette believed Fall was innocent. However, his suspicions were aroused after his own office in the Senate Office Building was ransacked.

Democrat Thomas J. Walsh of Montana, the most junior minority member, led a lengthy inquiry. For two years, Walsh pushed forward while Fall stepped backward, covering his tracks as he went. No evidence of wrongdoing was initially uncovered, as the leases were legal enough, but records kept disappearing mysteriously. Fall had made the leases appear legitimate, but his acceptance of the money was his undoing. By 1924, the remaining unanswered question was how Fall had become so rich so quickly and easily.

Money from the bribes had gone to Fall's cattle ranch and investments in his business. Finally, as the investigation was winding down with Fall apparently innocent, Walsh uncovered a piece of evidence Fall had failed to cover up: Doheny's $100,000 loan to Fall. This discovery broke open the scandal. Civil and criminal suits related to the scandal continued throughout the 1920s. In 1927, the Supreme Court ruled that the oil leases had been corruptly obtained. The Court invalidated the Elk Hills lease in February 1927, and the Teapot Dome lease in October. Both reserves were returned to the Navy.

In 1929, Fall was found guilty of accepting bribes from Doheny. Conversely, in 1930, Doheny was acquitted of paying bribes to Fall. Further, Doheny's corporation foreclosed on Fall's home in the Tularosa Basin, New Mexico, because of "unpaid loans" that turned out to be that same $100,000 bribe. Sinclair served six months in jail on a charge of jury tampering.

Although Fall was to blame for this scandal, Harding's reputation was permanently sullied because of his involvement with the wrong people. Evidence proving Fall's guilt only arose after Harding's death in 1923.

The Teapot Dome oil field was then idled for 49 years, but went back into production in 1976. Retrieved 4 June 2017</ref>

Legacy

The Supreme Court's ruling in McGrain v. Daugherty'' (1927) for the first time explicitly established that Congress had the power to compel testimony.

In response to the scandal, the Revenue Act of 1924 gave the chair of the United States House Committee on Ways and Means the right to obtain the tax records of any taxpayer. The Federal Corrupt Practices Act, which regulates campaign finance, was strengthened in 1925.

Comparison

The Teapot Dome scandal has historically been regarded as the worst such scandal in the United States – the "high water mark" of cabinet corruption. It is often used as a benchmark for comparison with subsequent scandals. In particular it has been compared to the Watergate scandal, in which a cabinet member, Attorney General John N. Mitchell, went to prison, the second time in American history that a member of the cabinet has been incarcerated.

See also
 Little Green House on K Street
 List of federal political scandals in the United States
 Teapot Dome Service Station

References

Further reading 

 
 
 History.com Editors. "Teapot Dome Scandal". HISTORY. 2017.
 
 
 
 

 
Petroleum in the United States
Political corruption scandals in the United States
1920s in the United States
Bribery scandals
Cover-ups
History of Kern County, California
History of the San Joaquin Valley
History of Wyoming
Natrona County, Wyoming
Oil fields in Kern County, California
Petroleum in California
Sinclair Oil Corporation
1922 in California
1923 in California
1922 in Wyoming
1923 in Wyoming